The RD-0110R (GRAU Index 14D24) is a rocket engine burning kerosene in liquid oxygen in a gas generator combustion cycle. It has four nozzles that can gimbal up to 45 degrees in a single axis and is used as the vernier thruster on the Soyuz-2-1v first stage. It also has heat exchangers that heat oxygen and helium to pressurize the LO2 and RG-1 tanks of the Soyuz-2.1v first stage, respectively. The oxygen is supplied from the same LO2 tank in liquid form, while the helium is supplied from separate high pressure bottles (known as the T tank).

The engine's development started in 2010 and it is a heavily modified version of the RD-0110. The main areas of work were shortening the nozzles to optimize them for the atmospheric part of the flight (the RD-0110 is a vacuum optimized engine), propellant piping, heat exchangers and the gimballing system, which was developed by TsSKB Progress. The RD-0110R engine is produced at the Voronezh Mechanical Plant.

See also
Soyuz-2-1v - The first rocket to use the RD-0110R
KBKhA - The RD-0110R designer bureau
RSC Progress - The designer of the Soyuz-2.1v and the RD-0110R nozzle gimbal
Voronezh Mechanical Plant - A space hardware manufacturer company that manufactures the RD-0110R

References

External links
 https://kbkha.ru/deyatel-nost/raketnye-dvigateli-ao-kbha/rd0110r/
 https://web.archive.org/web/20211208214531/http://www.vmzvrn.ru/produktsiya-i-uslugi/zhrd/rd-0110r/
 http://russianspaceweb.com/rd0110r.html

Rocket engines of Russia
Rocket engines of the Soviet Union
Rocket engines using kerosene propellant
Rocket engines using the gas-generator cycle
KBKhA rocket engines